Kaafu Atoll is an administrative atoll in the Republic of Maldives. It consists of two separate atolls: North Malé Atoll and South Malé Atoll. Together with smaller geographic atolls of Kaashidhoo Island and Gaafaru, the group forms the administrative division of Male' Atoll which is referred to by its Thaana alphabet letter code name Kaafu Atoll.

Malé, the capital of the Maldives, is at the southern end of North Male Atoll. The capital of Male atoll is Thulusdhoo, an island in North Male' atoll.

Islands

Inhabited islands
North Malé Atoll
Dhiffushi
Himmafushi
Hulhumalé
Huraa
Malé
Thulusdhoo
Villingili

South Malé Atoll
Gulhi
Guraidhoo
Maafushi

Individual Atolls/Islands
Gaafaru
Kaashidhoo

Resort islands
Resort islands are defined as uninhabited islands which have been converted to become resorts. Practically all uninhabited islands in Malé Atoll became tourist resorts during the two final decades of the 20th century.

North Male Atoll
Asdhoo
Baros
Bodubandos
Boduhithi
Eriyadhoo
Farukolhufushi
Furan-nafushi
Gasfinolhu
Giraavaru
Helengeli
Henbadhoo
Ihuru
Kanifinolhu
Kanuhuraa
Kudahithi
Lankanfinolhu
Lankanfushi
Lhohifushi
Makunudhoo
Medhufinolhu
Meerufenfushi, known as Meeru Island Resort and Spa
Nakachchaafushi
Thulhaagiri
Vabbinfaru
Vihamanaafushi, known as Kurumba Resort
Ziyaaraiffushi|

South Male Atoll
Biyaadhoo
Bodufinolhu
Bolifushi
Enboodhoo
Enboodhoofinolhu
Fihalhohi
Kandoomaafushi, known as Holiday Inn Kandooma
Mahaanaélhihuraa
Olhuveli
Ran-naalhi
Vaadhoo
Velassaru
Villingilivau

Other Uninhabited Islands
North Malé Atoll
Boduhuraa
Dhoonidhoo
Kanduoih-giri
Kudabandos
Feydhoofinolhu
Funadhoo
Kagi
Girifushi
Hulhulé (airport island)
Huraagandu
Kudahuraa
Madivaru
Olhahali
Rasfari
Vabboahuraa
Villingilimathidhahuraa

South Malé Atoll
Dhigufinolhu
Ehrruh-haa
Gulheegaathuhuraa
Kudafinolhu
Kalhuhuraa
Lhosfushi
Maadhoo
Makunufushi
Maniyafushi
Oligandufinolhu
Thanburudhoo
Thilafushi (industrial island)
Vaagali
Vammaafushi
Veliganduhuraa

Gaafaru Atoll
Velifaru

References
 Divehi Tārīkhah Au Alikameh. Divehi Bahāi Tārikhah Khidmaiykurā Qaumī Markazu. Reprint 1958 edn. Malé 1990.
 Divehiraajjege Jōgrafīge Vanavaru. Muhammadu Ibrahim Lutfee. G.Sōsanī. Malé 1999.

Atolls of the Maldives

dv:މާލެ އަތޮޅު